The discography of Welsh singer Rhydian Roberts consists of seven studio albums and three singles. His eighth album was released in February 2023, and became his 2nd album to top the UK Classical Albums Chart (after One Day Like This).

Studio albums

Singles

Notes

References

Discographies of British artists